René Maurer (born 6 April 1936) is a Swiss athlete. He competed in the men's high jump at the 1960 Summer Olympics.

References

1936 births
Living people
Athletes (track and field) at the 1960 Summer Olympics
Swiss male high jumpers
Olympic athletes of Switzerland
Place of birth missing (living people)